Right in the Nuts is a tribute album featuring various stoner rock bands covering Aerosmith songs. The title refers to the 1979 album Night in the Ruts by Aerosmith.

Track listing

References

Aerosmith
Tribute albums
2000 compilation albums